Ribulose-1,5-bisphosphate carboxylase/oxygenase, commonly known by the abbreviations RuBisCo, rubisco, RuBPCase, or RuBPco, is an enzyme involved in the first major step of carbon fixation, a process by which atmospheric carbon dioxide is converted by plants and other photosynthetic organisms to energy-rich molecules such as glucose. In chemical terms, it catalyzes the carboxylation of ribulose-1,5-bisphosphate (also known as RuBP). It is probably the most abundant enzyme on Earth.

Alternative carbon fixation pathways
RuBisCO is important biologically because it catalyzes the primary chemical reaction by which inorganic carbon enters the biosphere. While many autotrophic bacteria and archaea fix carbon via the reductive acetyl CoA pathway, the 3-hydroxypropionate cycle, or the reverse Krebs cycle, these pathways are relatively small contributors to global carbon fixation compared to that catalyzed by RuBisCO. Phosphoenolpyruvate carboxylase, unlike RuBisCO, only temporarily fixes carbon. Reflecting its importance, RuBisCO is the most abundant protein in leaves, accounting for 50% of soluble leaf protein in  plants (20–30% of total leaf nitrogen) and 30% of soluble leaf protein in  plants (5–9% of total leaf nitrogen). Given its important role in the biosphere, the genetic engineering of RuBisCO in crops is of continuing interest (see below).

Structure 

In plants, algae, cyanobacteria, and phototrophic and chemoautotrophic Pseudomonadota (formerly proteobacteria), the enzyme usually consists of two types of protein subunit, called the large chain (L, about 55,000 Da) and the small chain (S, about 13,000 Da). The large-chain gene (rbcL) is encoded by the chloroplast DNA in plants. There are typically several related small-chain genes in the nucleus of plant cells, and the small chains are imported to the stromal compartment of chloroplasts from the cytosol by crossing the outer chloroplast membrane. The enzymatically active substrate (ribulose 1,5-bisphosphate) binding sites are located in the large chains that form dimers in which amino acids from each large chain contribute to the binding sites. A total of eight large chains (= four dimers) and eight small chains assemble into a larger complex of about 540,000 Da. In some Pseudomonadota and dinoflagellates, enzymes consisting of only large subunits have been found.

Magnesium ions are needed for enzymatic activity. The close proximity allows for the formation of a covalent bond, resulting in the carbamate.  is first enabled to bind to the active site by the rotation of His335 to an alternate conformation.  is then coordinated by the His residues of the active site (His300, His302, His335), and is partially neutralized by the coordination of three water molecules and their conversion to −OH. Formation of the carbamate is favored by an alkaline pH. The pH and the concentration of magnesium ions in the fluid compartment (in plants, the stroma of the chloroplast) increases in the light. The role of changing pH and magnesium ion levels in the regulation of RuBisCO enzyme activity is discussed below. Once the carbamate is formed, His335 finalizes the activation by returning to its initial position through thermal fluctuation.

Enzymatic activity

RuBisCO is one of many enzymes in the Calvin cycle. The conversion involves these steps: enolisation, carboxylation, hydration, C-C bond cleavage, and protonation.

Substrates 
Substrates for RuBisCO are ribulose-1,5-bisphosphate and carbon dioxide (distinct from the "activating" carbon dioxide). RuBisCO also catalyses a reaction of ribulose-1,5-bisphosphate and molecular oxygen (O2) instead of carbon dioxide.
Discriminating between the substrates  and O2 is attributed to the differing interactions of the substrate's quadrupole moments and a high electrostatic field gradient. These conditions help explain the low turnover rate found in RuBisCO: In order to increase the strength of the electric field necessary for sufficient interaction with the substrates’ quadrupole moments, the C- and N- terminal segments of the enzyme must be closed off, allowing the active site to be isolated from the solvent and lowering the dielectric constant. This isolation has a significant entropic cost, and results in the poor turnover rate.

Binding RuBP 
This reaction involves binding of the carboxylate termini of Asp203 and Glu204 to the  ion. The substrate RuBP binds  displacing two of the three aquo ligands.

Enolisation 
Enolisation of RuBP is the conversion of the keto tautomer of RuBP to an enediol(ate). Enolisation is initiated by deprotonation at C3. The enzyme base in this step has been debated, but the steric constraints observed in crystal structures have made Lys210 the most likely candidate. Specifically, the carbamate oxygen on Lys210 that is not coordinated with the Mg ion deprotonates the C3 carbon of RuBP to form a 2,3-enediolate.

Carboxylation

Carboxylation of the 2,3-enediolate results in the intermediate 3-keto-2-carboxyarabinitol-1,5-bisphosphate and Lys334 is positioned to facilitate the addition of the  substrate as it replaces the third -coordinated water molecule and add directly to the enediol. No Michaelis complex is formed in this process. Hydration of this ketone results in an additional hydroxy group on C3, forming a gem-diol intermediate. Carboxylation and hydration have been proposed as either a single concerted step or as two sequential steps. Concerted mechanism is supported by the proximity of the water molecule to C3 of RuBP in multiple crystal structures. Within the spinach structure, other residues are well placed to aid in the hydration step as they are within hydrogen bonding distance of the water molecule.

C-C bond cleavage
The gem-diol intermediate cleaves at the C2-C3 bond to form one molecule of glycerate-3-phosphate and a negatively charged carboxylate. Stereo specific protonation of C2 of this carbanion results in another molecule of glycerate-3-phosphate. This step is thought to be facilitated by Lys175 or potentially the carbamylated Lys210.

Products
When carbon dioxide is the substrate, the product of the carboxylase reaction is an unstable six-carbon phosphorylated intermediate known as 3-keto-2-carboxyarabinitol-1,5-bisphosphate, which decays rapidly into two molecules of glycerate-3-phosphate. This product, also known as 3-phosphoglycerate, can be used to produce larger molecules such as glucose.

When molecular oxygen is the substrate, the products of the oxygenase reaction are phosphoglycolate and 3-phosphoglycerate. Phosphoglycolate is recycled through a sequence of reactions called photorespiration, which involves enzymes and cytochromes located in the mitochondria and peroxisomes (this is a case of metabolite repair). In this process, two molecules of phosphoglycolate are converted to one molecule of carbon dioxide and one molecule of 3-phosphoglycerate, which can reenter the Calvin cycle. Some of the phosphoglycolate entering this pathway can be retained by plants to produce other molecules such as glycine. At ambient levels of carbon dioxide and oxygen, the ratio of the reactions is about 4 to 1, which results in a net carbon dioxide fixation of only 3.5. Thus, the inability of the enzyme to prevent the reaction with oxygen greatly reduces the photosynthetic capacity of many plants. Some plants, many algae, and photosynthetic bacteria have overcome this limitation by devising means to increase the concentration of carbon dioxide around the enzyme, including  carbon fixation, crassulacean acid metabolism, and the use of pyrenoid.

Rubisco side activities can lead to useless or inhibitory by-products. Important inhibitory by-products include xylulose 1,5-bisphosphate and glycero-2,3-pentodiulose 1,5-bisphosphate, both caused by "misfires" halfway in the enolisation-carboxylation reaction. In higher plants, this process causes RuBisCO self-inhibition, which can be triggered by saturating  and RuBP concentrations and solved by Rubisco activase (see below).

Rate of enzymatic activity

Some enzymes can carry out thousands of chemical reactions each second. However, RuBisCO is slow, fixing only 3-10 carbon dioxide molecules each second per molecule of enzyme. The reaction catalyzed by RuBisCO is, thus, the primary rate-limiting factor of the Calvin cycle during the day. Nevertheless, under most conditions, and when light is not otherwise limiting photosynthesis, the speed of RuBisCO responds positively to increasing carbon dioxide concentration.

RuBisCO is usually only active during the day, as ribulose 1,5-bisphosphate is not regenerated in the dark. This is due to the regulation of several other enzymes in the Calvin cycle. In addition, the activity of RuBisCO is coordinated with that of the other enzymes of the Calvin cycle in several other ways:

By ions
Upon illumination of the chloroplasts, the pH of the stroma rises from 7.0 to 8.0 because of the proton (hydrogen ion) gradient created across the thylakoid membrane. The movement of protons into thylakoids is driven by light and is fundamental to ATP synthesis in chloroplasts (Further reading: Photosynthetic reaction centre; Light-dependent reactions). To balance ion potential across the membrane, magnesium ions move out of the thylakoids in response, increasing the concentration of magnesium in the stroma of the chloroplasts. RuBisCO has a high optimal pH (can be >9.0, depending on the magnesium ion concentration) and, thus, becomes "activated" by the introduction of carbon dioxide and magnesium to the active sites as described above.

By RuBisCO activase
In plants and some algae, another enzyme, RuBisCO activase (Rca), is required to allow the rapid formation of the critical carbamate in the active site of RuBisCO. This is required because ribulose 1,5-bisphosphate (RuBP) binds more strongly to the active sites of RuBisCO when excess carbamate is present, preventing processes from moving forward. In the light, RuBisCO activase promotes the release of the inhibitory (or — in some views — storage) RuBP from the catalytic sites of RuBisCO. Activase is also required in some plants (e.g., tobacco and many beans) because, in darkness, RuBisCO is inhibited (or protected from hydrolysis) by a competitive inhibitor synthesized by these plants, a substrate analog 2-carboxy-D-arabitinol 1-phosphate (CA1P). CA1P binds tightly to the active site of carbamylated RuBisCO and inhibits catalytic activity to an even greater extent. CA1P has also been shown to keep RuBisCO in a conformation that is protected from proteolysis. In the light, RuBisCO activase also promotes the release of CA1P from the catalytic sites. After the CA1P is released from RuBisCO, it is rapidly converted to a non-inhibitory form by a light-activated CA1P-phosphatase. Even without these strong inhibitors, once every several hundred reactions, the normal reactions with carbon dioxide or oxygen are not completed; other inhibitory substrate analogs are still formed in the active site. Once again, RuBisCO activase can promote the release of these analogs from the catalytic sites and maintain the enzyme in a catalytically active form. However, at high temperatures, RuBisCO activase aggregates and can no longer activate RuBisCO. This contributes to the decreased carboxylating capacity observed during heat stress.

By activase
The removal of the inhibitory RuBP, CA1P, and the other inhibitory substrate analogs by activase requires the consumption of ATP. This reaction is inhibited by the presence of ADP, and, thus, activase activity depends on the ratio of these compounds in the chloroplast stroma. Furthermore, in most plants, the sensitivity of activase to the ratio of ATP/ADP is modified by the stromal reduction/oxidation (redox) state through another small regulatory protein, thioredoxin. In this manner, the activity of activase and the activation state of RuBisCO can be modulated in response to light intensity and, thus, the rate of formation of the ribulose 1,5-bisphosphate substrate.

By phosphate
In cyanobacteria, inorganic phosphate (Pi) also participates in the co-ordinated regulation of photosynthesis: Pi binds to the RuBisCO active site and to another site on the large chain where it can influence transitions between activated and less active conformations of the enzyme. In this way, activation of bacterial RuBisCO might be particularly sensitive to Pi levels, which might cause it to act in a similar way to how RuBisCO activase functions in higher plants.

By carbon dioxide
Since carbon dioxide and oxygen compete at the active site of RuBisCO, carbon fixation by RuBisCO can be enhanced by increasing the carbon dioxide level in the compartment containing RuBisCO (chloroplast stroma). Several times during the evolution of plants, mechanisms have evolved for increasing the level of carbon dioxide in the stroma (see  carbon fixation). The use of oxygen as a substrate appears to be a puzzling process, since it seems to throw away captured energy. However, it may be a mechanism for preventing carbohydrate overload during periods of high light flux. This weakness in the enzyme is the cause of photorespiration, such that healthy leaves in bright light may have zero net carbon fixation when the ratio of O2 to  available to RuBisCO shifts too far towards oxygen. This phenomenon is primarily temperature-dependent: high temperatures can decrease the concentration of  dissolved in the moisture of leaf tissues.

Crassulacean acid metabolism (CAM) plants keep their stomata closed during the day, which conserves water but prevents the light-independent reactions (a.k.a. the Calvin Cycle) from taking place, since these reactions require  to pass by gas exchange through these openings. Evaporation through the upper side of a leaf is prevented by a layer of wax.

Genetic engineering 

Since RuBisCO is often rate-limiting for photosynthesis in plants, it may be possible to improve photosynthetic efficiency by modifying RuBisCO genes in plants to increase catalytic activity and/or decrease oxygenation rates. Approaches under investigation include transferring RuBisCO genes from one organism into another organism, engineering Rubisco activase from thermophilic cyanobacteria into temperature sensitive plants, increasing the level of expression of RuBisCO subunits, expressing RuBisCO small chains from the chloroplast DNA, and altering RuBisCO genes to increase specificity for carbon dioxide or otherwise increase the rate of carbon fixation.

Mutagenesis in plants 
In general, site-directed mutagenesis of RuBisCO has been mostly unsuccessful, though mutated forms of the protein have been achieved in tobacco plants with subunit C4 species, and a RuBisCO with more C4-like kinetic characteristics have been attained in rice via nuclear transformation. Robust and reliable engineering for yield of RuBisCO and other enzymes in the C3 cycle was shown to be possible, and it was first achieved in 2019 through a synthetic biology approach.

One avenue is to introduce RuBisCO variants with naturally high specificity values such as the ones from the red alga Galdieria partita into plants. This may improve the photosynthetic efficiency of crop plants, although possible negative impacts have yet to be studied. Advances in this area include the replacement of the tobacco enzyme with that of the purple photosynthetic bacterium Rhodospirillum rubrum. In 2014, two transplastomic tobacco lines with functional RuBisCO from the cyanobacterium Synechococcus elongatus PCC7942 (Se7942) were created by replacing the RuBisCO with the large and small subunit genes of the Se7942 enzyme, in combination with either the corresponding Se7942 assembly chaperone, RbcX, or an internal carboxysomal protein, CcmM35. Both mutants had increased  fixation rates when measured as carbon molecules per RuBisCO. However, the mutant plants grew more slowly than wild-type.

A recent theory explores the trade-off between the relative specificity (i.e., ability to favour  fixation over O2 incorporation, which leads to the energy-wasteful process of photorespiration) and the rate at which product is formed. The authors conclude that RuBisCO may actually have evolved to reach a point of 'near-perfection' in many plants (with widely varying substrate availabilities and environmental conditions), reaching a compromise between specificity and reaction rate. It has been also suggested that the oxygenase reaction of RuBisCO prevents  depletion near its active sites and provides the maintenance of the chloroplast redox state.

Since photosynthesis is the single most effective natural regulator of carbon dioxide in the Earth's atmosphere, a biochemical model of RuBisCO reaction is used as the core module of climate change models. Thus, a correct model of this reaction is essential to the basic understanding of the relations and interactions of environmental models.

Expression in bacterial hosts 
There currently are very few effective methods for expressing functional plant Rubisco in bacterial hosts for genetic manipulation studies. This is largely due to Rubisco's requirement of complex cellular machinery for its biogenesis and metabolic maintenance including the nuclear-encoded RbcS subunits, which are typically imported into chloroplasts as unfolded proteins. Furthermore, sufficient expression and interaction with Rubisco activase are major challenges as well. One successful method for expression of Rubisco in E. coli involves the co-expression of multiple chloroplast chaperones, though this has only been shown for Arabidopsis thaliana Rubisco.

Depletion in proteomic studies 
Due to its high abundance in plants (generally 40% of the total protein content), RuBisCO often impedes analysis of important signaling proteins such as transcription factors, kinases, and regulatory proteins found in lower abundance (10-100 molecules per cell) within plants. For example, using mass spectrometry on plant protein mixtures would result in multiple intense RuBisCO subunit peaks that interfere and hide those of other proteins.

Recently, one efficient method for precipitating out RuBisCO involves the usage of protamine sulfate solution. Other existing methods for depleting RuBisCO and studying lower abundance proteins include fractionation techniques with calcium and phytate, gel electrophoresis with polyethylene glycol, affinity chromatography, and aggregation using DTT, though these methods are more time-consuming and less efficient when compared to protamine sulfate precipitation.

Evolution of RuBisCO

Phylogenetic studies 
The chloroplast gene rbcL, which codes for the large subunit of RuBisCO has been widely used as an appropriate locus for analysis of phylogenetics in plant taxonomy.

Origin 

Non-carbon-fixing proteins similar to RuBisCO, termed RuBisCO-like proteins (RLPs), are also found in the wild in organisms as common as Bacillus subtilis. This bacterium has a rbcL-like protein with a 2,3-diketo-5-methylthiopentyl-1-phosphate enolase function, part of the methionine salvage pathway. Later identifications found functionally divergent examples dispersed all over bacteria and archaea, as well as transitionary enzymes performing both RLP-type enolase and RuBisCO functions. It is now believed that the current RuBisCO evolved from a dimeric RLP ancestor, acquiring its carboxylase function first before further oligomerizing and then recruiting the small subunit to form the familiar modern enzyme. The small subunit probably first evolved in anaerobic and thermophilic organisms, where it enabled RuBisCO to catalyze its reaction at higher temperatures. Substitutions that do not have an effect without the small subunit suddenly become beneficial when it is bound. Furthermore, the small subunit enabled the accumulation of substitutions that are only tolerated in its presence. Accumulation of such substitutions leads to a strict dependence on the small subunit, which is observed in extant Rubiscos that bind a small subunit.

C4 
This was achieved through enhancement of conformational flexibility of the “open-closed” transition in the Calvin cycle. Laboratory-based phylogenetic studies have shown that this evolution was constrained by the trade-off between stability and activity brought about by the series of necessary mutations for C4 RuBisCO. Moreover, in order to sustain the destabilizing mutations, the evolution to C4 RuBisCO was preceded by a period in which mutations granted the enzyme increased stability, establishing a buffer to sustain and maintain the mutations required for C4 RuBisCO. To assist with this buffering process, the newly-evolved enzyme was found to have further developed a series of stabilizing mutations. While RuBisCO has always been accumulating new mutations, most of these mutations that have survived have not had significant effects on protein stability. The destabilizing C4 mutations on RuBisCO has been sustained by environmental pressures such as low  concentrations, requiring a sacrifice of stability for new adaptive functions.

History of the term
The term "RuBisCO" was coined humorously in 1979, by David Eisenberg at a seminar honouring the retirement of the early, prominent RuBisCO researcher, Sam Wildman, and also alluded to the snack food trade name "Nabisco" in reference to Wildman's attempts to create an edible protein supplement from tobacco leaves.

The capitalization of the name has been long debated. It can be capitalized for each letter of the full name (Ribulose-1,5 bisphosphate carboxylase/oxygenase), but it has also been argued that is should all be in lower case (rubisco), similar to other terms like scuba or laser.

See also 

Carbon cycle
Photorespiration
Pyrenoid
C3 carbon fixation

C4 carbon fixation
Crassulacean acid metabolism/CAM photosynthesis
Carboxysome

References

Further reading

External links 
 

Photosynthesis
EC 4.1.1